Norman Joseph Walz (July 18, 1915 - March 30, 1984) was an American member of the Minnesota State Senate, serving District 63 from 1955 to 1962 and District 57 from 1963 to 1966.

Walz was born in Detroit Lakes, Minnesota and graduated from Detroit Lakes High School. He served in the United States Navy from 1934 to 1935. He served on the Detroit Lakes City Council.

References

1915 births
1984 deaths
20th-century American politicians
People from Detroit Lakes, Minnesota
Military personnel from Minnesota
Minnesota city council members
Minnesota state senators
United States Navy sailors